¿Hoy Es Mañana? (Today is Tomorrow?) is the second studio album by Mexican singer Anahí, released in Mexico on June 16, 1996. It did not chart anywhere. 

With this Anahí material appears again after being away for some mean time, surprising everyone with its remarkable change because there was nothing else that girl that came in Chiquilladas. Anahí image I use as butterflies, which led him to where. As a promotion launched three singles, the first single was "Theme Chocolate Heart," released in 1996, which featured a music video.

The second single from the album "Corazón de Bombón" was released the same year. The last single from the album was released the same year as the previous two, and was "Descontrolándote". The November 23, 2011 on sale material through digital download in Mexico, Brazil, Spain and the United States.

Disclosure
Anahí began promoting the album with live performances of simple songs on the album, in 1996, interpreted the theme "Corazón de Bombón" in Mexico's Siempre en Domingo led by Raul Velasco. In 1996, it was presented on the Day of the Child Festival singing "Corazón de Bombón". In 1996, it airs on Galavision Mexico's interpretation of "Corazón de Bombón". In 1997, as part of the promotion of their third album Anclado en mi Corazón it was filmed in VHS format, entitled anchored in mi corazón concert, held at the Teatro Alameda in Mexico City, the themes were interpreted "Por Volverte a Ver" and "Corazón de Bombón" In 1998, during the recording of the live soap opera for Elena, where Anahí plays Talita Carvajal, interprets the theme "Corazón de Bombón" in an episode as part of a dream character.

Track listing

References

External links
 Anahí's official website

1996 albums
Anahí albums
Spanish-language albums